The Freeway Series is a Major League Baseball (MLB) interleague rivalry played between the Los Angeles Angels and the Los Angeles Dodgers. The Angels are members of the American League (AL) West division, and the Dodgers are members of the National League (NL) West division. The series takes its name from the massive freeway system in the greater Los Angeles metropolitan area, the home of both teams; one could travel from one team's stadium to the other simply by driving along Interstate 5.  The term is akin to Subway Series which refers to meetings between New York City baseball teams. The term "Freeway Series" also inspired the official name of the region's NHL rivalry between the Los Angeles Kings and the Anaheim Ducks: the Freeway Face-Off.

Background

The rise of Southern California as a major region of the United States brought about a significant economic rivalry between neighboring Los Angeles and Orange counties.

To many living outside of Southern California, the entire region is often simply referred to as "LA", associating Los Angeles and Orange counties with the same stereotypes and preconceptions. However, the two counties differ sharply in political ideology, socioeconomic status, and demographics. 

Los Angeles County is considered more liberal, and is represented by a more ethnically diverse population, while Orange County was known to be one of the most conservative areas in the state.  This divide led to the Los Angeles/Orange county line being colloquially referred to as the Orange Curtain.

This can be somewhat misleading, though, because the older, more urban, cities of northern and central Orange County (Anaheim, Santa Ana, Garden Grove, Buena Park, etc.) are much more in tune with Los Angeles County cities than their southern Orange County counterparts. These older Orange County cities are much less homogeneous than the south, and the income levels and demographics represent this.

In recent years, coinciding with the postseason success of the Dodgers and the growing postseason drought for the Angels, gameday experiences for each team have drastically changed (with a Dodgers game costing much more money to attend than an Angels game) because of this the economic situations of each fanbase have experienced a sort of role reversal. Another contributing factor of the changing fanbases of both franchises is the ownership of the Angels by Arte Moreno (the first Mexican-American to own a major sports team in the United States) which has led to a significant growth of its Hispanic and Latino American fanbase. This has even become a contributing factor toward players such as Anthony Rendon choosing to sign with the Angels over that of the Dodgers.

History

The first exhibition game between the two clubs (won by the Angels) was played in 1962 in Palm Springs, at the time the spring training home of the Angels. The first pre-season series was played at Dodger Stadium, at the time the home ballpark of both teams  April 6–7, 1963.  The Angels won both of the two games played. After the Angels added Los Angeles to their official name in 2005, the rivalry took on renewed interest, as the series took on a more intracity atmosphere.

Throughout the 2005 season, Dodger Stadium listed the Angels as "ANA" on its out-of-town scoreboard and team schedules, as it was prior to Angels' name change. However, the Dodgers now post "LAA" on both their scoreboard and schedules. Dodger broadcaster Vin Scully refers to the team as just the Angels when mentioning them on the air.  Dodgers tickets still refer to the Angels as the "Anaheim Angels." As of the 2011 season, however, the Angels' out-of-town scoreboard in right field still lists the Dodgers by their pre-2005 "LA" abbreviation instead of "LAD".  The Angels' name change was largely opposed by the Dodgers organization, city and county of Los Angeles, Anaheim, every other city in Orange County, and fans on both sides.  The prevailing argument was that the Angels did not play within Los Angeles county limits, and that adding LA to the name inaccurately represented the location and background of the team's fans.  The Angels' ownership countered that bringing the Los Angeles name to the American League was beneficial to the entire region and organization. Furthermore, the Census Bureau's definition of Greater Los Angeles includes Orange County in its definition, and the Angels have always used Los Angeles stations to broadcast their TV and radio games.  The adding of the "Los Angeles" to the Angels name still causes some resentment in the minds of both Angel and Dodger fans today.The team was referred to as the California Angels.

Regular- and post-season games between the two teams take place at either Angel Stadium of Anaheim or Dodger Stadium.

At one point, both teams were owned by major media conglomerates: the Angels had been owned by the Walt Disney Company, and the Dodgers were owned by News Corporation (each company owned one of the MLB broadcast partners, with News Corporation changing its name to 21st Century Fox in 2013, and subsequently being purchased by the Walt Disney Company in 2019). Both teams have been sold in recent years.

During the 2002 World Series, there was a moment of peace in the rivalry as a result of the nightmares the Dodgers and their fans were facing because the Angels played the San Francisco Giants, the fierce in-state rivals of the Dodgers. The Los Angeles Times called the series "the Dodgers' 'Nightmare Series.'" The New York Post called it "the worst-scenario World Series for the Dodgers." The San Francisco Chronicle called the series "a Dodger fan's worst nightmare." The Dodgers and their fans, including Chairman Bob Daly and former manager Tommy Lasorda, rooted for the eventual champions and attended their games in Anaheim. Lasorda was at Game 2 and stood behind the batting cage and said that he's a big fan of Angels manager Mike Scioscia (Scioscia had spent his entire 13 year playing career with the Dodgers). Daly attended Game 7 and sat near the Angels dugout, as a fan of late Angels owner Gene Autry. This series was the Angels first championship, while the Dodgers' most recent title came in the 2020 World Series.

History was made in  when two MVPs were chosen from the same metropolitan area with the Angels outfielder Mike Trout winning the American League MVP and Dodger pitcher Clayton Kershaw winning National League MVP for the year. This occurred again in  when the Angels' Trout and Dodgers' Cody Bellinger won their league's respective MVP awards.

Results

|-
| 1997
| style=";" | Dodgers
| 4–0
| 5-4; 8-2
| 3-4; 5-7
| First season series sweep by either team.
|-
| 1998
| style=";" | Angels
| 3–1
| 5-6; 4-6
| 5-6(11); 3-2
| 
|-
| 1999
| style=";" | Dodgers
| 4–2
| 6-7(10); 3-1; 13-3
| 4-5; 4-7; 7-5
| First year of 6-game home-and-away format.
|-

|-
| 2000
| style=";" | Angels
| 4–2
| 5-12; 8-3; 7-8
| 3-4(10); 5-3; 6-2
| 
|-
| 2001
| style=";" | Angels
| 4–2
| 6-2; 5-6; 4-6
| 1-0; 1-2; 6-5(10)
|
|- 
| 2002
| Tie
| 3–3
| 7-5; 1-7; 0-5
| 8-4; 5-10; 4-5
| Angels advance to the American League playoffs as the Wild Card, Win American League pennant, and Angels win 2002 World Series.
|-
|-
| 2003
| style=";" | Angels
| 4–2
| 0-3; 0-3; 1-3
| 2-5; 2-4; 6-3
|
|-
| 2004
| Tie
| 3–3
| 3-7; 8-5; 6-2
| 13-0; 7-5; 5-10
| Both teams make the postseason for the first time.
|-
| 2005
| style=";" | Angels
| 5–1
| 0-7; 1-3; 3-5
| 9-0; 3-1; 2-6
|  Angels add "Los Angeles" to their name (see City of Anaheim v. Angels Baseball LP for more information.) Angels win American League West Division title and finish as runner-up in their respective league championship series.
|-
| 2006
| style=";" | Dodgers
| 4–2
| 6-1; 2-9; 0-4
| 3-16; 4-8; 0-7
| Dodgers advance to the National League playoffs as the Wild Card, Angels finished second in the American League West Division standings.
|-
| 2007
| style=";" | Angels
| 5–1
| 1-9; 2-6; 1-4 
| 1-2; 3-0; 10-4
| Angels win their first of three consecutive American League West Division titles.
|-
| 2008
| Tie
| 3–3
| 2-4; 6-3; 2-10
| 0-6; 0-1; 1-0
| Both teams win their respective divisions. Dodgers finish as runner-up in their National league championship series.

|-
| 2009
| Tie
| 3–3
| 4-5; 6-4; 5-3
| 3-1; 4-5(10); 10-7
|Both teams win their respective divisions and finish as runner-ups in their respective league championship series.
|-

|-
| 2010
| style=";" | Angels
| 5–1
| 3-6; 1-2; 10-6
| 10-1; 4-2; 6-5
| First Angels sweep at Dodger Stadium.
|-
| 2011
| style=";" | Angels
| 4–2
| 5-0; 1-7; 1-3
| 8-3; 6-1; 2-3
|
|-
| 2012
| style=";" | Angels
| 4–2
| 5-8; 3-1; 3-5
| 3-2; 2-5; 2-1
|
|-
| 2013
| Tie
| 2–2
| 3-4; 2-3
| 7-8; 0-3
| Series changed to four-game format with two in each city, except in years the AL West plays the NL West (2015, 2018, etc.) Dodgers win their first of eight consecutive National League West Division titles (current). Dodgers finish as runner-up in their National league championship series.
|-
| 2014
| style=";" | Dodgers
| 3–1
| 2-1; 7-0
| 5-0; 4-5
| Both teams win their respective divisions.
|-
| 2015
| style=";" | Dodgers
| 5–1
| 7-5; 6-4; 2-3
| 3-5; 1-3; 3-5
| Dodgers win National League West Division.
|-
| 2016
| style=";" | Angels
| 3–1
| 1-8; 4-7
| 7-6; 1-5
|Angels drop “of Anaheim” from their name. Dodgers win National League West Division and finish as runner-up in their National league championship series.
|-
| 2017
| Tie
| 2–2
| 2-3; 6-2
| 4-0; 0-4
| Dodgers win National League West Division, win National league pennant, and Dodgers lose 2017 World Series. 
|-
| 2018
| Tie
| 3–3
| 2-3; 3-1; 3-4
| 2-3; 5-4(10); 3-5
| Dodgers win National League West Division, win National league pennant, and Dodgers lose 2018 World Series.
|-
| 2019
| style=";" | Angels
| 4–0
| 3-5; 3-5
| 5-4; 3-2
| First season series sweep by the Angels and first by either team since 1997, the first year with interleague play. Dodgers win National League West Division
|-

|-
| 2020
| style=";" | Dodgers
| 6–0
| 7-4; 6-5(10); 8-3
| 5-9; 6-7; 0-5
| Season shortened to 60 games due to COVID-19 pandemic. Second season series sweep by the Dodgers. Dodgers win National League West Division, National league pennant, and  2020 World Series
|-
| 2021
| Tie
| 3–3
|2-9; 14-11; 1-2
| 4-3(10); 3-5; 2-8
| Albert Pujols signs with the Dodgers after being released by the Angels on May 17
|-
| 2022
| style=";" | Dodgers
| 4–0
| 9-1; 7-1
| 0-2; 1-4
| Third season series sweep by the Dodgers
|-
| 2023
|
|
|
|
|
|-

|-
| Overall Regular Season
| style=";" | Angels 
| style=";" | 73–67
|  Angels, 42–28
|  Dodgers, 39–31
| 
|-

Postseason series
To meet in the postseason would require that they both advance to the World Series in the same year. To date, the two teams have made the playoffs in the same year four times: 2004, 2008, 2009, and 2014. In 2004, both teams lost in their respective Division Series, whereas in 2008 the Angels lost to the Boston Red Sox, 3–1 in the Division Series while the Dodgers swept the Chicago Cubs 3–0 and lost to the eventual champion Philadelphia Phillies 4–1 in the National League Championship Series. In 2009, both teams advanced to their respective League Championship Series. The Angels lost the ALCS 4–2 to the eventual champion New York Yankees, while the Dodgers lost the NLCS to the Phillies, 4–1.

In 2014, both teams finished first in their respective divisions. However, the Angels were swept, 3–0, by the Kansas City Royals in the ALDS, while the Dodgers lost 3–1 to the St. Louis Cardinals in the NLDS.

See also
Major League Baseball rivalries
Bay Bridge Series, Oakland Athletics vs. San Francisco Giants
I-5 Series, San Diego Padres vs Los Angeles Dodgers (named for the freeway connecting both cities)
Red Line Series, Chicago Cubs vs. Chicago White Sox (Named for the Red-line "L" route)
Subway Series, New York Yankees vs. New York Mets, etc.
Beltway Series, Washington Nationals vs. Baltimore Orioles
Citrus Series, Miami Marlins vs. Tampa Bay Rays
Show-Me Series, Kansas City Royals vs. St. Louis Cardinals
Lone Star Series, Houston Astros vs. Texas Rangers
Ohio Cup, Cleveland Guardians vs. Cincinnati Reds

Other rivalries in the Los Angeles area
National Hockey League: Freeway Face-Off
College Football: UCLA–USC rivalry
Major League Soccer: El Tráfico
National Basketball Association: Lakers–Clippers rivalry
National Football League: Chargers-Rams rivalry

Former
National Football League: Raiders-Rams rivalry
Major League Soccer: Honda SuperClasico

References
Inline citations

Bibliography

Los Angeles Angels
Los Angeles Dodgers
Interleague play
Major League Baseball rivalries
1997 establishments in California
Annual events in Major League Baseball
Major League Baseball in Los Angeles